Noobz is a 2012 American comedy film, directed by (and also starring) Blake Freeman.

Plot
Four friends face down a mace-spraying mother, a 1980s arcade champ, and Casper Van Dien in their quest to take the top prize at the Cyberbowl Video Game Championship in Los Angeles, and prove that all of those hours playing Xbox were spent wisely. When Cody (Blake Freeman) lost his job, he turned to video games for pleasure. Meanwhile, things go from bad to worse when Cody's wife grows weary of being married to a gamer, and walks out on him. But when Cody's pal Andy (Jason Mewes) rallies their old gang the Reign Clan to compete in the Cyberbowl Video Game Championship, it appears to be the perfect opportunity to put their gaming skills to use, and win a big cash prize in the process. With the old pals Oliver (Matt Shively) and "Hollywood" (Moises Arias) in tow, Cody and Andy set their sights on Los Angeles. Unfortunately for the Reign Clan, the forces of the universe seem to be working against them. Now, as the contest draws near and Andy finally gets some quality face time with gamer goddess Rickie (Zelda Williams), the Reign Clan find that their enemies on the virtual battlefield are no match for the real-life foes who are determined to see them fail.

Cast
Blake Freeman as Cody
Moises Arias as Hollywood
Jason Mewes as Andy 
Jon Gries as Greg Lipstein 
Matt Shively as Oliver 
Casper Van Dien as Casper Van Dien
Sabrina Carpenter as Brittney
Jesse Heiman as Computer Guy
Lin Shaye as Mrs. Theodore 
Carly Craig as Melissa 
Mindy Sterling as Mrs. Robinson 
Richard Speight Jr. as Jeff
Brien Perry as Mr. Perry
Bill Bellamy as Brian Bankrupt Simmons
Zelda Williams as Rickie
Chenese Lewis as Milkshake
Skylan Brooks as Chomomma
India Oxenberg as Pixie teammate

Reception
Noobz received mediocre reviews; of the three critic reviews on Rotten Tomatoes, all are negative.

References

External links 
 

2012 films
2012 comedy films
American comedy films
Films about video games
Films set in Los Angeles
2010s English-language films
2010s American films